Scopula candida  is a moth of the family Geometridae. It was described by Prout in 1934. It is endemic to Costa Rica.

References

Moths described in 1934
candida
Endemic fauna of Costa Rica
Taxa named by Louis Beethoven Prout
Moths of Central America